Running lights may refer to:
Lights on vehicles designed to increase visibility while moving - see:

 Daytime running lamp, for increased visibility of vehicles during the day
 Automotive lighting, for running lights for cars
 Bicycle lighting, for running lights for bicycles
 Navigation light, for running lights for aircraft, ships and spacecraft

 Running lights (theater), running lights used in theaters
 Chase lights
 "Running Lights", a song by Sonata Arctica in Pariah's Child